Faceless World is the third studio album by German heavy metal band U.D.O., released on 25 February 1990 via RCA Records. It was recorded in Dierks Studios in Cologne and mastered in Hamburg. The album's musical style features a more light approach than previous and future albums, and achieved great success. Previous guitarist Andy Susemihl had left the band, but takes writing credits for "System of Life", "Living on a Frontline" and "Future Land". Guitarist Wolla Böhm was added, but is only credited and pictured in the album as a member, although he does perform with the band in the "Heart of Gold" music video. All guitar work was done by Mathias Dieth.

Track listing

Personnel
 Udo Dirkschneider –  vocals
 Mathias Dieth –  guitars, backing vocals
 Thomas Smuszynski –  bass
 Stefan Schwarzmann –  drums

Production
Stefan Kaufmann – production, mixing
Uli Baronowsky – engineer, mixing
Ananda Kurt Pilz – cover art
Wolfgang Burat – photography
Tim Eckhorst – design (anniversary edition)

Charts

References

External links 
 Faceless World on Discogs

1990 albums
U.D.O. albums
RCA Records albums